Elaine Crowley may refer to:

 Elaine Crowley (author) (1927–2011), Irish author
 Elaine Crowley (presenter) (born 1977), Irish journalist, presenter and newsreader